Shafiqur Rahaman Chowdhury is a Bangladesh Awami League politician and the former Member of Parliament of Sylhet-2.

Early life and education
Chowdhury was born into a Bengali Muslim family in the village of Chandbharang in Dashghar Union, Bishwanath, Sylhet District, East Pakistan (now Bangladesh). He was a descendant of Shah Chand, whom the village is named after, who was the son of Shaykh Kalu, a disciple of Shah Jalal who participated in the Muslim conquest of Sylhet in 1303. His father was Abdul Matlib Chowdhury, a notable community leader abroad, and his mother was Latifun Nisa Chowdhury.

Chowdhury received his Secondary School Certificate from Chandbharang High School in 1972. He moved on to study at the Murari Chand College in Sylhet where he got his Higher Secondary School Certificate in 1975 and Bachelor of Arts in 1979.

Career
Chowdhury became a member of the Bangladesh Chhatra League as a student in 1969. After moving to the United Kingdom in 1978, he became involved with the Awami League and served numerous roles as part of the United Kingdom Awami League branch. He also served as secretary for the Tower Hamlets Community Development Trust, director of the Bethnal Green City Challenge, president of the Bishwanath Expatriate Education Trust, and secretary of the Expatriate Voting Rights Implementation Committee. He served as co-chairman for numerous sub-committees and was a member of the London Boishakhi Mela Committee, Banglatown Bastabayan and London Bangladesh Centre Ad Hoc Committee.

Chowdhury was elected to parliament from Sylhet-2 as a Bangladesh Awami League candidate in 2008. He resided in the United Kingdom and returned to Bangladesh for the election.

References

Awami League politicians
Living people
9th Jatiya Sangsad members
1957 births
People from Bishwanath Upazila
20th-century Bengalis
21st-century Bengalis
Bangladeshi emigrants to England
Murari Chand College alumni